Intimidad de los parques is a 1965 Argentine film directed by Manuel Antín. Like Antín's film Circe, it is based on a short story by Antín's compatriot Julio Cortázar. Cortázar was bitterly disappointed in the film and expressed his sentiments in a pair of letters to Antín written in March and April 1965.

Cast
Dora Baret		
Ricardo Blume 		
Francisco Rabal

References

External links
 

1965 films
1960s Spanish-language films
Argentine black-and-white films
Films based on short fiction
Films based on works by Julio Cortázar
Films directed by Manuel Antín
1960s Argentine films